The 1969–70 season was Port Vale's 58th season of football in the English Football League, and their fifth successive season (sixth overall) in the Fourth Division. They achieved promotion with a fourth-place finish, taking them back into the Third Division. They started the season with an eighteen match unbeaten run in the league, and finished with nine games unbeaten following a dip in form around January. Manager Gordon Lee credited the teamwork and fitness of an extremely settled side for the promotion campaign, as ten players made at least 35 league appearances.

Overview

Fourth Division
In the pre-season there were talks of bringing speedway to Vale Park, introducing a new team to the British League Division Two. However many were opposed to the idea, and a 2,600 strong petition was given to local MP John Forrester. The idea was killed when the council failed to grant planning permission, despite a 3,000 strong petition in favour of the proposal. The club had hoped to profit from the venture, however many locals were concerned about noise pollution. Gordon Lee meanwhile had little in the way of funds when it came to signing new players, and so he was only able to bring in three new attackers on free transfers: Ken Wookey (Newport County); Stuart Shaw (Southport); and Eric Magee (Oldham Athletic).

They continued on from their unbeaten result at the end of the previous season, to make a club-record unbeaten sequence of ten away games, and nineteen games home and away {5 May to 8 November}. Five of these results were goalless draws, as the defence proved stronger than the attack following the departure of top-scorer Roy Chapman at the end of the previous season. Nevertheless, the run put them at the top of the table, and Lee credited his team's hard work and fitness. John James played on despite an injured ankle, Mick Morris found himself a permanent fixture as an energetic utility man, whilst Tommy McLaren also worked his way into the first eleven. The defence conceded just six goals in the opening fifteen league games. The run included a 1–0 win over Chesterfield at Saltergate, a 2–0 win over nearby Crewe Alexandra in front of a season-best Burslem crowd of 12,538, and a 'war of attrition' in a 1–1 draw 'full of ugly incidents' with Wrexham at the Racecourse Ground in front of a crowd of 19,946. Their 22 November fixture at the Old Showground with Scunthorpe United could have seen the Vale equal the best start to an English League season in the twentieth century. After a Wookey goal put them ahead they lost after a disputed penalty and a bizarre own goal from Roy Sproson. Meanwhile, Vale could not afford the £500 registration fee for Ian Buxton following the player's departure from Notts County, and so the club could only sign him for an initial three-month period.

Injuries and suspensions helped to dent the Vale's form, as they lost their status as league leaders. On 17 January, Sproson made his 800th senior appearance in a 2–0 victory over Exeter City. In an attempt to lift the club, Lee signed wing-half Tony Lacey on loan from Stoke City, and also bought Bill Summerscales from Leek Town for £400. Heading into a six-game unbeaten run, Lee signed Buxton permanently, despite the player's decision to retire at the end of the season. In March, Chairman Arthur McPherson pleaded guilty to receiving stolen goods and so was sentenced to an eighteen-month suspended sentence and fined £1,500. Resigning his position at the club, he was replaced by Mark Singer. On 9 March, the match against Hartlepool had to be suspended for five minutes after Vale fans continually pelted the opposition keeper with snowballs. Signing Lacey permanently for £2,500, and Sammy Morgan on a free from Gorleston, Vale were in a close battle for promotion. Unbeaten in their final nine games, they secured promotion with what The Sentinel'''s Peter Hewitt called a 'blockade formula' – they conceded just four goals in this run.

They finished in fourth place with 59 points, three points clear of fifth place. His side promoted, Lee said that 'no team could have deserved reward as much for their hard work and strength of character'. With 33 goals conceded, only Chesterfield conceded fewer. Only seventeen players were used all season, whilst eight barely missed a game between them. On 31 May, they played a Potteries derby friendly with First Division Stoke and won 3–2 at the Victoria Ground.

Finances
On the financial side, a loss of £3,003 was made despite fund raising donations of £17,925. Gate receipts were up by over £13,000 as home attendances were encouraging, however expenditure had increased and there was a transfer deficit of £2,900. Six players were let go at the season's end, including Ken Wookey (Workington); Stuart Shaw (Morecambe); Eric Magee (Linfield); Stuart Chapman (Stafford Rangers); and Gordon Logan (Kettering Town).

Cup competitions
In the FA Cup, they had to overcome Northern Premier League Wigan Athletic at Springfield Park, but could only manage a 1–1 draw. After a 2–2 draw back in Stoke-on-Trent, the second replay was held at Old Trafford, Manchester. James scored two minutes from the end of extra-time to finally kill off the non-leaguers. After a 3–1 defeat at Prenton Park to Tranmere Rovers in a replay, the Vale were out of the competition with a profit of £5,000 from their five games.

In the League Cup, a First Round exit came courtesy of Third Division Tranmere Rovers at Vale Park.

League table

ResultsPort Vale's score comes first''

Football League Fourth Division

Results by matchday

Matches

FA Cup

League Cup

Player statistics

Appearances

Top scorers

Transfers

Transfers in

Transfers out

Loans in

References
Specific

General

Port Vale F.C. seasons
Port Vale